U.S. Route 281 (US 281) is a part of the U.S. Highway System that travels from Hidalgo, Texas and Brownsville, Texas, to its northern terminus at the International Peace Garden, north of Dunseith, North Dakota. In the U.S. state of North Dakota, US 281 extends from the South Dakota state line south of Ellendale, North Dakota and ends at the North Dakota–Manitoba border.

Route description
In North Dakota, US 281 is a major north–south artery. It enters south of Ellendale and intersects Interstate 94 and US 52 at Jamestown. 281 and 52 remain paired together to Carrington. From there, US 281 continues northward through Sheyenne. Ten miles north of Sheyenne the highway curves in order to go around Devil's Lake, and then continues to west of Minnewaukan. From there it goes to ND  at Rocklake. US 281 follows ND 5 westward to Dunseith, where the highway turns north in concurrence with North Dakota Highway 3 to its end at the Canadian border in the International Peace Garden. The northernmost section of US 281 passes through North Dakota's Turtle Mountains.

History

The entire route of US 281 within the state was North Dakota Highway 4. In 1934, US 281 replaced Highway 4 south of Rock Lake. US 281 was extended north to the Canada border between 1939 and 1940, replacing the remainder of Highway 4.

Recently, US 281 was rebuilt near Minnewaukan, North Dakota to accommodate flooding close to the city.

Major intersections

See also

References

External links

281
Transportation in Dickey County, North Dakota 
Transportation in LaMoure County, North Dakota 
Transportation in Stutsman County, North Dakota
Transportation in Foster County, North Dakota 
Transportation in Eddy County, North Dakota 
Transportation in Benson County, North Dakota 
Transportation in Towner County, North Dakota 
Transportation in Rolette County, North Dakota
 North Dakota